Penajam North Paser Regency is a regency in the Indonesian province of East Kalimantan. Its administrative centre is the town of Penajam. The area which now forms Penajam North Paser was part of Paser Regency until its separation in the year 2002. It covers an area of 3,333.06 km2 (of which 3,060.82 km2 is land area and 272.24 km2 is sea area) and it had 142,922 inhabitants at the 2010 census and 178,681 at the 2020 census; the official estimate as at mid 2021 was 180,657. Penajam North Paser Regency has the smallest area among the seven regencies in East Kalimantan province.

The regency was historically part of Paser Kingdom, which was a dependency of Banjar Sultanate. It is the second youngest regency in East Kalimantan. In 2019, parts of the regency was said to be the location of new Indonesian capital.

History 

The word "Paser" came from two combination of words in native language of Paser people, "pa" which means "bright" and "ser" which means "spirit". Combined, the word "Paser" roughly means "bright spirit". The word "Paser" also originated from the name of former kingdom in the region, Paser Kingdom. Penajam is a name used to refer the region where the regency now located. As the regency was formerly northern part of the Paser Kingdom and the region was used to be called Penajam, it was named Penajam North Paser Regency.

The region was inhabited by several tribes such as Lolo, Adang, and Kali whom each founded small tribal kingdoms. The Paser Kingdom was founded by combination of several tribes. Smaller tribal kingdoms soon disappeared due to urbanization to capital of Paser Kingdom or migration to interior, which caused these kingdoms population to drop rapidly.

Geography

Governance

Administrative districts 
Penajam North Paser Regency is divided into four districts (kecamatan), tabulated below with their areas and their populations at the 2010 census and the 2020 census. The table also includes the location of the district administrative centres, the number of administrative villages (rural desa and urban kelurahan) in each district, and its postal codes.

Notes: (a) including fifteen small offshore islands. (b) includes two small offshore islands - Pulau Jawang and Pulau Sabut. (c) The village of Maridan has a postcode of 76146, Sepaku and Karang Jinawi share 76148, Mentawir has 76149; the other eleven villages share 76147.

Local government and politics 
The Penajam North Paser Regency is a second-level administrative division equivalent to a city. As a regency, it is headed by a regent who is elected democratically. Heads of districts are appointed directly by the regent on the recommendation of the regency secretary. Executive power lies with the regent and vice regent while legislative function is exercised by the regency's parliament.

Economy 
The regency's gross regional product is mostly consist of mining, agriculture, and manufacturing sector. Mining sector contributed to 25.83% of the regency's gross regional product, followed by agriculture with 21.96%, manufacturing with 16.46%, and construction with 11.84%. Other sectors are also present such as trade and wholesale with 9.41%, education sector 3.82%, and administration with 3.68%. The regency experienced economic contraction of 2.34% on 2020 with the fastest declining sector are manufacturing and mining, while the fastest growing was electricity and gas with growth of 20%.

The main commodities in the regency is palm oil, which in 2021 has total plantation area of 47,960 hectares. Other commodities include 41,622 tons of rice, 1,700 tons of corn, and 1,562 tons of cassava. There are also 14,451 quintals of cucumber and ginger with 133 tons in 2021. There are livestocks in the regency such as beef cattle with 17,191 in 2019, followed by 4,864 goats, and 615 pigs. There are also around 1.9 million of chicken population. Penajam district produced the most chicken meat with output of 487,715 kilograms. Main resources that are mined in the regency is coal.

On hospitality and tourism sector, there are 17 hotels registered in the regency as of 2020. According to the regency government, there are 24 tourist spots identified in the regency. In 2020, the regency was visited by 19,539 visitors from which 9,262 are visiting the tourist spots. There are also 41 registered restaurants in the regency as of 2020.

There are total 257 registered cooperatives in the regency, most of which are located in Penajam.

Demographics

Infrastructure

Education 
As of 2021, the regency has 79 kindergartens, 109 elementary schools, 42 junior highschools, and 13 senior highschools. In addition, there are 10 vocational highschools in the regency as of 2021. The regency does not have a higher education institutions as of 2021, but there are plans to construct a university in town of Penajam.

Health 
The regency has one hospital, 10 polyclinics, 54 puskesmas, 41 pharmacies, in addition to 10 medical clinics and 273 healthcare posts. The main and only hospital in the regency is Ratu Aji Putri Botung Regional Hospital, located in town of Penajam. The hospital is public and operated by the regency government. It was classified as C-class by Ministry of Health.

Transportation 
The regency has total road length of 1,371 kilometers as of 2021, most of which are maintained by regency government. Around 347 kilometers are paved with asphalt, 566 kilometers have gravel surface, while the rest are other surfaces such as soil. More than half of the road were considered in good condition as of 2021 by Ministry of Public Works and Housing. The town of Penajam in the regency has several ports such as Buluminung Port which supports transportation to Buluminung Industrial Zone. There are smaller ports around the regency which support speed boats and ferries mostly from Balikpapan.

The regency itself has no airport. The closest airports however are Sultan Aji Muhammad Sulaiman Sepinggan International Airport in Balikpapan and Aji Pangeran Tumenggung Pranoto International Airport in Samarinda, both are international airports. There are bus routes served by Perum DAMRI to Balikpapan, Samarinda, and town of Tanah Grogot. The regency's main bus terminal located on town of Penajam.

As with other places in Indonesia, there are angkot around the regency especially in the town of Penajam. Other than that, the regency also has presence of online ride-hailing services. The online ride-hailing services are available only in Penajam, Waru, and Babulu districts.

Others 
The regency has total 523 mosques, 48 Protestant churches, and 9 Catholic churches. The regency has regional library operated by regency government, located in town of Penajam. It is a relatively new library, built on late 2021. There are total 132 base transceiver station in the regency as of 2021 to support communication in the region, most of which are operated by private companies.

There's one sport stadium located in town of Penajam, named Benuo Taka stadium.

References 

 
2002 establishments in Indonesia